PP-25 Jhelum-I is a Constituency of Provincial Assembly of Punjab.

General elections 2013

General elections 2008
Ch Muhammad Saqlain succeeded in the election 2008 and became the member of Provincial Assembly.

See also
 PP-24 Talagang-II
 PP-26 Jhelum-II

References

External links
 Election commission Pakistan's official website
 Awazoday.com check result
 Official Website of Government of Punjab

Constituencies of Punjab, Pakistan